Benedikt Saller is a German professional footballer who plays as a defensive midfielder for SSV Jahn Regensburg.

References

External links
 

1992 births
Living people
German footballers
Footballers from Munich
Association football midfielders
Bundesliga players
2. Bundesliga players
3. Liga players
TSV 1860 Munich players
1. FSV Mainz 05 II players
1. FSV Mainz 05 players
SSV Jahn Regensburg players